Phyllis McKee Rankin (August 31, 1874 – November 17, 1934) was a Broadway actress and singer from the 1880s to the 1920s.

Early life
Phyllis McKee Rankin was the second daughter of stage actors Elizabeth "Kitty" Blanchard and Arthur McKee Rankin, also known as McKee Rankin. 

Her older sister, Gladys Rankin, was also an entertainer with her husband Sidney Drew in an act billed Mr. & Mrs. Sidney Drew, and her younger half-sister, Doris Rankin, was a stage and screen actress and one-time wife of actor Lionel Barrymore. In September 1890, Elizabeth Rankin filed a motion contesting her husband's resistance to providing support for their daughter. A previous suit, in which she filed for separation from Davenport, was being considered by the New York Supreme Court. Mrs. Davenport was regarded as "the foremost and best-known character actress and stage artist" of her generation.

Phyllis Rankin was tutored by her father in "old school drama". She made her first stage appearance as a youth of 10 with her parents in Stormbeaten. She eventually left her father's companies and was managed by Charles Frohman. 

A house belonging to McKee Rankin at 40 Edgecombe Avenue, near 136th Street, burned in the early morning of April 1, 1891. Rankin and her mother were inside when the fire began in a linen closet. The blaze was contained and put out through the efforts of a "bucket brigade". Damage was estimated at $400 and was covered by insurance.

Acting career
Rankin was in the supporting cast of Sara, a play performed at the Palmer Theatre (Wallack's Theatre), in the summer of 1890. Sara played the abandoned wife of a French adventurer named Antoine la Rue. Albert M. Palmer gained control of Wallack's Theatre in 1888 and produced plays in New York City through 1896.

Rose Coghlan obtained Rankin to replace Jennie Yeamans in an 1892 production of The Check Book. In April 1893 she appeared in the Arabian Nights on a variety bill at the Standard Theatre, 6th Avenue between 32nd Street and 33rd Street,
Frohman's comedians were also featured performers.

In February 1897, Rankin was part of a bill at the Olympia Music Hall, 1514–16 Broadway (Manhattan) (44th Street), that included Auguste van Biene. The same month she appeared at the Twenty-Third Street Theatre, 139 West Twenty-Third Street, of Frederick Francis Proctor. In May, she entertained at the St. Nicholas Music Hall, West 66th Street near Columbus Avenue. She sang at Koster & Bial's Music Hall, 729 6th Avenue and 23rd Street, in June.
In July Rankin performed with Lizzie Evans and George Thatcher at Keith's New Union Square Theatre, near Broadway at 14th Street. During
her engagement at the B.F. Keith establishment, she did impersonations of Anna Held. At the Casino Theatre, 1404 Broadway (West 39th Street), Rankin played Fifi Fricot in The Belle of New York, which had a one-week booking in December 1897.

By August 1898, she was receiving offers from English managers of comic opera. The Belle of New York was staged at the Shaftesbury Theatre with Harry Davenport in the company. Davenport portrayed a doctor and Rankin, a housekeeper, in Three Wise Fools. The two met and married in the original production of The Belle of New York. In the musical they sang a famous duet, When We Are Married.

Other productions in which she acted were The Rounders, It Happened in Nordland, and Fascinating Flora.

Death
Rankin died in Canton, Pennsylvania, in 1934 at the age of 60. She and Harry Davenport married and were the parents of Arthur Rankin, a writer and actor in motion pictures. He died from a cerebral hemorrhage following an extended illness in 1947.

Their grandson was producer and director Arthur Rankin Jr. After her wedding to Davenport, Rankin left the stage for eleven years before returning in a small role in Lightnin, in August 1918. The couple later teamed at the Criterion Theatre for a production of Three Wise Fools. Rankin was the mother of three other children, 2 of whom acted on stage.

After the death of his wife, Harry Davenport entered motion pictures and reached fame with his supporting role as Dr. Meade in Gone with the Wind.

References

External links

 
 Harry Davenport and Phyllis Rankin family papers, 1857-circa 1946 , held by the Billy Rose Theatre Division, New York Public Library for the Performing Arts

Actresses from New York City
American musical theatre actresses
American women singers
Vaudeville performers
1874 births
1934 deaths
19th-century American actresses
American stage actresses
20th-century American actresses